"Du hast mein Herz gebrochen" ("You Broke My Heart") is a song by German singer Yvonne Catterfeld. It was written by Dieter Bohlen and Eko Fresh, and was produced by Bohlen for Catterfeld's second studio album, Farben meiner Welt (2004).

Formats and track listings

Credits and personnel
Credits taken from the Farben einer Welt liner notes.

 Arrangement – Lalo Titenkov 
 Co-producer – Jeo, Lalo Titenkov 
 Artwork – Ronald Reinsberg  
 Guitar – Jörg Sander 
 Lyrics, music, production – Dieter Bohlen
 Mixing – Jeo

Charts

Weekly charts

Year-end charts

References

External links
 YvonneCatterfeld.com – official website

2004 singles
2004 songs
Yvonne Catterfeld songs
Hansa Records singles
Songs written by Dieter Bohlen